Alexis Bladimir López García (born 1 May 1997 in Mexicali) is a Mexican rower.

He won the bronze medal at the 2016 World Rowing U23 Championships.
He won the final B at the 2017 World Championships – lightweight single sculls.
He won the gold medal at 2019 Pan American Games in the lightweight double sculls, and also a silver medal at lightweight coxless four.

Notes

References

External links
 

1997 births
Living people
Mexican male rowers
Pan American Games medalists in rowing
Pan American Games gold medalists for Mexico
Pan American Games silver medalists for Mexico
Rowers at the 2019 Pan American Games
Rowers at the 2015 Pan American Games
Medalists at the 2019 Pan American Games
Medalists at the 2015 Pan American Games
20th-century Mexican people
21st-century Mexican people